Jason Watt (born 24 February 1970) is a Danish racing driver. Watt enjoyed a fruitful karting career before moving into Formula Ford in 1992. He graduated to the British Formula Vauxhall Lotus Winter Series in 1993, winning the championship, as well as winning the following years Brands Hatch Formula Ford Festival, and British Formula Ford championship.

In 1995, Watt won the Formula Opel Euroseries and had a one-off outing in the German Formula Three Championship. In 1996 he followed several other "coming men" of the time, such as Dario Franchitti, Juan Pablo Montoya and Jan Magnussen, into the International Touring Car Championship, driving a JAS Engineering entered Alfa Romeo. He also kept his single-seater ambitions alive by contesting a round of the British Formula 2 championship for Fred Goddard Racing.
  
Watt's career had progressed as far as the International Formula 3000 championship by 1997, where he was a consistent frontrunner and was recognised as one of the best up and coming talents. In 1997 and 1998 Jason drove for David Sears' Super Nova Racing team, under the Den Blå Avis banner, in deference to his major sponsor. He won one race each year. For 1999 he was promoted to the main Super Nova Racing squad and was a championship contender, winning twice and finishing the year as championship runner-up.

Watt's single-seater career was curtailed by a motorcycle accident during the off-season late in 1999 which left him paralysed from the chest down. He has since continued to race successfully in touring cars driving specially modified cars, and in 2002 won the Danish Touring Car Championship.

In March 2008, Watt formed his own touring car team with a car from SEAT. Team Bygma Jason Watt Racing raced at the 2009 FIA WTCC Race of Germany.

In 2012 Watt moved from touring cars to Legends car racing. He also acts as team manager of Team Wounded Racing endurance team whose drivers are more or less physically disabled Afghanistan war veterans. All drivers have either amputations or spinal cord injuries.

Personal life
Jason Watt is the father of three. He has been married to the danish tv-host Mai-Britt Vingsøe, with whom he has the twins Noah and Filuca. Mai-Britt and Jason divorced in 2003. His second marriage was to Sara Matthiesen in 2007, with whom he has the son Silas. They divorced in 2008 after only 17 months of marriage. In 2016 Jason married Majbrit Heidi Berthelsen.

Watt's son Noah Watt is a racing driver, currently competing in the inaugural Danish F4.

Racing record

Complete International Touring Car Championship results
(key) (Races in bold indicate pole position) (Races in italics indicate fastest lap)

Complete International Formula 3000 results
(key) (Races in bold indicate pole position) (Races in italics indicate fastest lap)

Complete Danish Touring Car Championship results
(key) (Races in bold indicate pole position) (Races in italics indicate fastest lap)

Complete WTCC results
(key) (Races in bold indicate pole position) (Races in italics indicate fastest lap)

Complete Scandinavian Touring Car Championship results
(key) (Races in bold indicate pole position) (Races in italics indicate fastest lap)

References

http://www.watt.dk/

External links
 

1970 births
Living people
Danish racing drivers
Formula Ford drivers
German Formula Three Championship drivers
International Formula 3000 drivers
British Formula 3000 Championship drivers
Danish Touring Car Championship drivers
World Touring Car Championship drivers
European Touring Car Championship drivers
Swedish Touring Car Championship drivers
Opel Team BSR drivers
Super Nova Racing drivers